The women's rhythmic individual hoop gymnastics competition at the 2018 Commonwealth Games in Gold Coast, Australia was held on 13 April at the Coomera Indoor Sports Centre.

Final
Results:

References

Gymnastics at the 2018 Commonwealth Games
2018 in women's gymnastics